Robert Thomas Woods (born April 10, 1992) is an American football wide receiver for the Houston Texans of the National Football League (NFL). He played college football at USC, where he was recognized as a consensus All-American. He was drafted by the Buffalo Bills in the second round of the 2013 NFL Draft. He previously played for the Los Angeles Rams and Tennessee Titans.

Early years
Woods was born in Gardena, California on April 10, 1992. He first attended Killian Elementary and Alvarado Intermediate. He then attended and played high school football and ran track at Junípero Serra High School in Gardena, California, where he was a teammate of George Farmer and Marqise Lee. In his junior year, in 2008, Woods had 81 receptions for 1,378 yards and 19 touchdowns to go along with 15 carries for 124 rushing yards on offense. He also had 87 tackles, seven interceptions, and one fumble recovery on defense.

In his senior year, in 2009, Woods caught 66 passes for 1,112 yards, had five carries for 70 yards, and had 96 total tackles along with eight interceptions and a forced fumble on defense for the Serra Cavaliers. In his senior year, his team won the CIF Northwestern Division Championship defeating west coast power house Oaks Christian, ending their winning streak at 34. His team would then play and beat Marin Catholic 24–20 to win the CIF Division 3 state championship and complete the season undefeated 15–0. They ranked fifth in the West according to USA Today.  Following his senior season, Woods was recognized as a USA Today high school All-American and played in the 2010 U.S. Army All-American Bowl. As an accomplished sprinter, Woods was a 2010 All-USA high school track & field selection by USA Today. He recorded personal bests of 21.04 seconds in the 200 meter dash, and 46.17 seconds in the 400 meter dash. Woods' 400 meters time of 46.17 ranked him #11 on the 2010 World Junior list, #4 in the USA. At the 2010 CIF California State Meet, Woods finished runner-up in the 400 metres to Joshua Mance in a photo finish. He placed third in the 200 metres, behind Remontay McClain and Davonte Stewart. He had career-bests of 21.04 seconds in the 200 metres and 46.17 seconds in the 400 metres. He graduated in 2010.  Scout.com rated him as the No. 11 prospect overall and No. 1 wide receiver prospect. Rivals.com listed him as the nation's No. 6 overall recruit, and the No. 1 ranked athlete. He accepted a scholarship to attend the University of Southern California.

College career
Woods played college football for the USC Trojans football from 2010 to 2012 under head coach Lane Kiffin.

2010 season
Woods was an immediate contributor for the Trojans as a freshman. In his first collegiate game, at Hawaii, he had four receptions for 46 receiving yards. On September 18, against Minnesota, he had his first collegiate touchdown on a 97-yard kickoff return. On September 25, against Washington State, he had his first collegiate receiving touchdown, a 11-yard reception from quarterback Matt Barkley. On October 9, he had a breakout performance with 12 receptions for 224 receiving yards and three receiving touchdowns against Stanford. In his next game, he had seven receptions for 116 receiving yards and two receiving touchdowns against California. Overall, he finished his freshman season with 65 receptions for 792 receiving yards and six receiving touchdowns. In addition, he was a prolific kickoff returner, finishing first in the Pac-10 that year in kickoff returns with 38 and kickoff return yards with 971.

2011 season
Woods started his sophomore season with a strong performance against Minnesota with 17 receptions for 177 receiving yards and three receiving touchdowns. On September 24, in a game at Arizona State, he had eight receptions for 131 receiving yards. In the following game, against Arizona, Woods had a stellar performance with 14 receptions for 255 receiving yards and two receiving touchdowns.  On October 22, against Notre Dame, he had 12 receptions for 119 receiving yards and two receiving touchdowns. On November 4, against Colorado, he had nine receptions for 130 receiving yards and two receiving touchdowns. On November 19, he had seven receptions for 53 receiving yards and two receiving touchdowns against Oregon. The next week, against UCLA, he had 12 receptions for 113 receiving yards and two receiving touchdowns. Overall, he finished his sophomore season with 111 receptions for 1,292 receiving yards and 15 receiving touchdowns. He led the Pac-12 in receptions and receiving touchdowns and finished fourth in the conference in receiving yards. As a result of his stellar sophomore season, Woods was one of three finalists for the 2011 Biletnikoff Award and Maxwell Award. In addition, he was named as a Consensus All-American.

2012 season
Woods started his junior season with six receptions for 42 receiving yards and two receiving touchdowns against Hawaii. In the next game, against Syracuse, he had 10 receptions for 93 receiving yards and two receiving touchdowns. Over the next four games, he had 20 receptions for 225 receiving yards and one receiving touchdown. On October 20, against Colorado, he had eight receptions for 132 receiving yards and four receiving touchdowns. In the final five games of the season, he finished with 30 receptions for 357 receiving yards and two receiving touchdowns. Woods declared for the 2013 NFL Draft after his junior season.

Collegiate statistics

Professional career
Prior to his junior season in April 2012, Woods was projected a top five prospect and ranked as the top wide receiver prospect in the next NFL Draft. By mid-season, Woods' draft projection fell to the late first round, due to his declining role in the Trojans' offense and the emergence of Marqise Lee.

Buffalo Bills
The Buffalo Bills drafted Woods in the second round (41st overall) of the 2013 NFL Draft. Woods was the fifth wide receiver drafted and was the first of two wide receivers selected by the Bills in 2013, before third round pick (78th overall) Marquise Goodwin.

2013 season: Rookie year

On May 20, 2013, the Bills signed Woods to a four-year, $4.86 million contract that includes
$2.49 million guaranteed and a signing bonus of $1.91 million.

Throughout training camp, Woods competed to be the secondary starting wide receiver against T. J. Graham and Brad Smith. Head coach Doug Marrone named Stevie Johnson and Woods the starting wide receivers to begin the regular season.

Woods made his NFL debut and first career start in the season-opener against the New England Patriots and caught his first NFL touchdown on an 18-yard pass from quarterback E. J. Manuel in a narrow 23–21 loss. The touchdown also marked his first career reception. During Week 9, Woods caught four passes for 44 yards before leaving in the third quarter of a 23–13 loss to the Kansas City Chiefs due to an ankle injury. He remained inactive for the next two games (Weeks 10–11). During Week 15, Woods caught a season-high five passes for 82 yards and scored his third touchdown of the season during a 27–20 road victory over the Jacksonville Jaguars. In the next game, Woods was ejected for throwing a punch at safety Reshad Jones after the two engaged in a tussle during the Bills' 19–0 shut-out win over the Miami Dolphins.

Woods finished his rookie year with 40 receptions for 587 yards and three touchdowns in 14 games and starts.

2014 season

During training camp, Woods competed to retain his role as a starting wide receiver against Mike Williams and Chris Hogan. Marrone named Woods and rookie Sammy Watkins as the starting wide receivers to begin the regular season, although Williams started at wide receiver in all four preseason games.

During a Week 14 38-3 victory over the New York Jets, Woods caught a season-high nine passes for 118 yards and a touchdown. The game took place at Ford Field in Detroit due to a snowstorm in New York.

Woods finished his second professional season with a career-high 65 receptions for 699 yards and five touchdowns in 16 games and 15 starts. He finished second on the team in all three categories and also recorded four combined tackles on special teams.

2015 season

On January 1, 2015, head coach Doug Marrone chose to opt out of his contract and resigned from his head coaching position. On January 13, the Bills announced their decision to hire former New York Jets' head coach Rex Ryan as their new head coach. Woods competed against Percy Harvin to be the No. 2 starting wide receiver during training camp. Ryan named Woods the third wide receiver on the Bills' depth chart to start the regular season in 2015, behind Sammy Watkins and Percy Harvin. Woods replaced Harvin in the starting lineup after Harvin was placed on injured reserve due to a season-ending knee injury.

During Week 7, Woods caught a season-high nine passes for 84 yards and a touchdown during a narrow 34–31 road loss against the Jacksonville Jaguars. During Week 14, he had five receptions for a season-high 106 yards in a 26–20 road loss against the Philadelphia Eagles. On December 22, 2015, Woods was placed on injured reserve after he aggravated a groin injury he sustained during training camp. His injury sidelined him for the last two games (Weeks 16–17) of the regular season.

Woods finished his first season under new offensive coordinator Greg Roman with 47 receptions for 552 yards and three touchdowns in 14 games and nine starts.

2016 season

Woods entered training camp as a starting wide receiver in 2016. Rex Ryan retained Woods and Sammy Watkins as the starting wide receiver tandem to begin the regular season in 2016.

Woods was inactive during the Bills' Week 7 loss at the Miami Dolphins due to a foot injury. Two weeks later, he caught a season-high ten passes for 162 yards during a 31–25 road loss against the Seattle Seahawks. Woods was sidelined for two games (Weeks 12–13) due to a knee injury.

Woods finished his fourth season with 51 receptions for 613 yards and a touchdown in 13 games and ten starts.

Los Angeles Rams
On March 9, 2017, Woods was signed by the Los Angeles Rams to a five-year, $34 million contract that includes $15 million guaranteed.

2017 season

Woods entered training camp slated as the No. 1 starting wide receiver. Head coach Sean McVay named Woods and Sammy Watkins the starting wide receivers to begin the regular season.

During Week 3, Woods caught six passes for 108 yards in a 41–39 road victory over the San Francisco 49ers on Thursday Night Football. In Week 8, he had four catches for 70 yards and caught two touchdowns during a 51–17 road victory over the New York Giants. The performance marked Woods' first multi-touchdown game of his career. In the next game, Woods caught eight passes for a season-high 171 yards and two touchdowns in a 33–7 victory over the Houston Texans. During the game, he caught a 94-yard touchdown reception to set a franchise record for the longest touchdown reception since 1964. It was the most receiving yards by a Rams player since Torry Holt had 200 receiving yards in a 2003 game against the San Francisco 49ers. The following week, Woods caught a season-high eight passes for 81 yards during a 24–7 road loss against the Minnesota Vikings. He sustained a shoulder injury in the fourth quarter and was inactive for the next three games (Weeks 12–14). McVay decided to rest Woods and multiple starters for the regular-season finale against the San Francisco 49ers in preparation for the playoffs. The Rams lost 34–13.

Woods finished his first season with the Rams with 56 receptions for a career-high 781 yards and five touchdowns in 12 games and 11 starts.

The Rams finished the 2017 season atop the NFC West with an 11–5 record. On January 6, 2018, Woods started in his first NFL playoff game and caught a game-high nine passes for 142 yards during a 26–13 loss to the Atlanta Falcons in the Wild Card Round.

2018 season: Super Bowl appearance

Woods returned as the Rams' No. 1 wide receiver and started alongside second-year receiver Cooper Kupp and offseason acquisition Brandin Cooks.

During Week 3, Woods caught ten receptions for 104 yards and two touchdowns in a 35–23 victory over the Los Angeles Chargers. In the next game against the Minnesota Vikings, he had five receptions for 101 yards and a touchdown in the 38–31 victory. Two weeks later, Woods had seven receptions for 109 yards in a 23–20 road victory over the Denver Broncos. During Week 14 against the Chicago Bears, he caught seven passes for 61 yards as the Rams lost 15–6. Woods reached 1,000 receiving yards for the season for the first time in his career in this game.

Woods finished the 2018 season with 86 receptions for 1,219 yards and six touchdowns in 16 games and starts. In the playoffs, Woods helped the Rams defeat the Dallas Cowboys in the Divisional Round with six receptions for 69 yards in a 30–22 victory. He had six receptions for 33 yards as the Rams defeated the New Orleans Saints on the road in overtime by a score of 26–23 in the NFC Championship to reach Super Bowl LIII where they faced the New England Patriots. In the Super Bowl, Woods recorded five catches for 70 yards and a five-yard rush but the Rams lost by a score of 13–3 in the lowest-scoring Super Bowl in history. He was ranked 76th by his fellow players on the NFL Top 100 Players of 2019.

2019 season

During Week 4 against the Tampa Bay Buccaneers, Woods caught 13 passes for 164 yards in the 55–40 loss. During Week 13 against the Arizona Cardinals, he had 13 catches for 172 yards in a 34–7 victory. In the next game against the Seattle Seahawks, Woods rushed twice for 29 yards and caught seven passes for 98 yards and his first touchdown of the season during the 28–12 victory. During Saturday Night Football against the San Francisco 49ers in Week 16, he finished with eight catches for 117 yards as the Rams lost 31–34 and were eliminated from playoff contention.

Woods finished the 2019 season with 90 receptions for 1,134 yards and two touchdowns in 15 games and starts.

2020 season

Woods started off the 2020 season with six receptions for 105 receiving yards in a 20–17 victory over the Dallas Cowboys on Sunday Night Football. On September 18, 2020, Woods signed a four-year, $65 million contract extension with the Rams. 
In Week 11 against the Tampa Bay Buccaneers on Monday Night Football, Woods recorded 12 catches for 130 yards and a touchdown during the 27–24 win.
He later earned the NFC Offensive Player of the Week award. Overall, in the 2020 season, Woods finished with 90 receptions for 936 receiving yards and six receiving touchdowns. In addition, he had 24 carries for 155 rushing yards and two rushing touchdowns. The Rams made the playoffs and earned the #6-seed in the NFC. In the Wild Card Round against the Seattle Seahawks, he had four receptions for 48 receiving yards and a touchdown in the 30–20 victory.

2021 season: Injury-shortened season

On November 12, 2021, Woods tore his ACL during practice, ending his season. Prior to his injury, Woods had 45 catches and 556 yards to go with five touchdowns in nine games played. The Rams went on to win Super Bowl LVI against the Cincinnati Bengals without Woods. Coincidentally, the Rams signed Odell Beckham Jr., who would play a crucial role in their Super Bowl run, the day before Woods' injury.

Tennessee Titans
On March 19, 2022, Woods was traded to the Tennessee Titans for a 2023 sixth-round pick. He finished the season as the Titans leading receiver, despite career-low numbers, with 53 catches for 527 yards and two touchdowns. The Titans released him on February 22, 2023.

Houston Texans
On March 14, 2023, Woods signed a two-year contract with the Houston Texans.

NFL career statistics

Regular season

Postseason

Personal life
Woods is the son of Robert Woods, who played for the Houston Oilers in 1978 and for the Detroit Lions in 1979.

Woods lost his sister, Olivia, to cancer on April 19, 2007. Her death and final words to him motivated Woods to pursue his goals of making it into the NFL and finishing his college degree. Woods honored her in his commencement speech upon graduating from USC.

On July 7, 2018, Woods married longtime partner Alexandra Barbee.

References

External links

 
 Tennessee Titans bio
 USC Trojans bio
 

1992 births
Living people
African-American players of American football
All-American college football players
American football wide receivers
American football return specialists
Buffalo Bills players
Houston Texans players
Los Angeles Rams players
People from Gardena, California
Players of American football from California
Sportspeople from Los Angeles County, California
USC Trojans football players
21st-century African-American sportspeople
Tennessee Titans players
Ed Block Courage Award recipients